Cryptolechia dorsoprojecta is a moth in the family Depressariidae. It was described by Wang in 2006. It is found in Fujian, China.

The length of the forewings is 15–16 mm. The forewings are orange yellow, with dense brown scales, becoming denser at the base. The costal margin has a large dark brown blotch at about three-fourths of the length, diffused downward to the tornus. The apex is brown, forming a somewhat broad fascia along the termen and joined with the blotch at the tornus. There is a dark brown dot set at the middle of the cell and at two-thirds of the fold. The hindwings are deep grey.

Etymology
The species name refers to the large dorsal process of the sacculus and is derived from Latin dorso- (meaning dorsal) and projectus (meaning prominent).

References

Moths described in 2006
Cryptolechia (moth)